Boardman Michael Robinson (1876–1952) was a Canadian-American painter, illustrator and cartoonist.

Biography

Early years

Boardman Robinson was born September 6, 1876 in Nova Scotia. He spent his childhood in England and Canada, before moving to Boston in the first half of the 1890s. Robinson worked his way through normal school, following a program to learn mechanical drafting.

Robinson first studied art at the Massachusetts College of Art in Boston. He would later go on to study at the Académie Colarossi and the École des Beaux-Arts, both in Paris, where he was influenced by the political cartooning of Honoré Daumier, as well as Forain and Steinlen.

In 1903, Robinson married Sarah Senter Whitney. The couple moved to Paris where Robinson briefly worked as art editor for Vogue, before returning to the United States in 1904.

Career

Upon returning to the United States, Robinson worked as an illustrator, drawing cartoons and theater illustrations for the New York Morning Telegraph. He freelanced for a wide range of other popular publications, including Pearson's Magazine, Scribner's Magazine, Collier's, Harper's Weekly, and others.

In 1910, Robinson took a job on the staff of the New York Tribune drawing editorial cartoons, a position which he retained for four years. With the eruption of World War I in 1914, Robinson's increasingly radical anti-militarist political views brought him into conflict with his employer and he quit the publication.

In 1915, Robinson travelled to Eastern Europe on behalf of Metropolitan Magazine along with journalist John Reed. The pair saw first hand the effects of the European war in Russia, Serbia, Macedonia and Greece. In 1916 Reed's account of the journey was collected in a book called The War in Eastern Europe, to which Robinson contributed illustrations.

On his return from Europe, Robinson worked at the socialist monthly The Masses. His highly political cartoons as well as the general anti-war stance of The Masses was deemed to have violated the recently passed Espionage Act of 1917, and The Masses had to cease publication. Robinson, along with the other defendants were acquitted on October 5, 1918. Following The Masses, Robinson became a contributing editor to The Liberator and The New Masses, working with former Masses editor Max Eastman.

Robinson would later go on to teach art at the Art Students League in New York City (1919–30) and head the Colorado Springs Fine Arts Center  (1936–47). Some of his students include Duard Marshall, James Brooks, Bill Tytla, Edmund Duffy, Jacob Burck, Russel Wright, Eric Bransby, Rifka Angel, Mary Anne Bransby, Gerhard Bakker, and Esther Shemitz (who married Whittaker Chambers):  both Burck and Shemitz contributed illustrations to The New Masses as did their mentor.)

Robinson is also known as a muralist.  Some of his mural commissions include works at Rockefeller Center and the Department of Justice Building in Washington, D.C. and a nine-panel mural on the History of Trade for Kaufmann's flagship department store in Pittsburgh completed in 1929.

Robinson also illustrated several books, among them editions of Walt Whitman's Leaves of Grass (1921), Dostoyevsky's The Brothers Karamazov (1933), Edgar Lee Masters' Spoon River Anthology (1941), and Herman Melville's Moby Dick (1942).

Death and legacy

Boardman Robinson died on September 5, 1952.

Footnotes

Gallery

Further reading

 Albert Christ-Janer, Boardman Robinson. Chicago: University of Chicago Press, 1946.

External links

1876 births
1952 deaths
Canadian emigrants to the United States
20th-century American painters
American male painters
American illustrators
American muralists
American socialists
Art Students League of New York faculty
Massachusetts College of Art and Design alumni
Académie Colarossi alumni
American alumni of the École des Beaux-Arts
People acquitted under the Espionage Act of 1917
Artists of the American West
Artists from Nova Scotia
New-York Tribune personnel
People of the New Deal arts projects
Artists from Boston
Painters from Massachusetts
American editorial cartoonists
20th-century American male artists